Gaobeidian may refer to the following locations in China:

Gaobeidian, a county-level city under the administration of Baoding, in Hebei Province.
Gaobeidian, Beijing, in Chaoyang District, Beijing.

See also
Gaobeidian station, a metro station on Batong Line of the Beijing Subway, in Chaoyang District, Beijing.
Gaobeidian railway station, a railway station in Gaobeidian, Baoding, Hebei Province.